Sabre River is a 1984 adventure module for the Dungeons & Dragons roleplaying game.  Its associated product code is CM3.

Plot summary
Sabre River is an adventure in which the player characters must go to the Tower of Terror where they explore a dungeon setting located inside an active volcano, and take a journey on an underground river.

A mysterious curse has hit a barony in the realm of Norwold: The waters of the Sabre River have been tainted, bringing death or evilness to all who drink from them. The player characters are charged to seek out the source of this curse, in the company of Cutter, a young boy who is strangely immune to the effects of the curse. In fact, Cutter plays a more vital role in the restoring of Sabre River than one would expect.

Publication history
CM3 Sabre River was written by Douglas Niles and Bruce Nesmith, with a cover by Keith Parkinson, and was published by TSR in 1984 as a 32-page booklet with an outer folder.

Reception

See also
 List of Dungeons & Dragons modules

References

External links
Sabre River entry from Pen-paper.net
The "CM" modules from The Acaeum

Dungeons & Dragons modules
Mystara
Role-playing game supplements introduced in 1984